Gese may refer to:

People
Bartholomäus Gesius (also: Göß, Gese) (c. 1562 – 1613), a German theologian
Gese Wechel (died 1645), managing director of the Swedish Post Office

Other uses
 Georgian Stock Exchange, or GeSE
 Germanium selenide, a chemical compound with the formula GeSe
 Graded Examinations in Spoken English (GESE), of the Trinity College London ESOL examinations board

See also
 Goose, plural geese